The Stereo and God is a mini album by the band Joy Zipper released in 2003.

Track listing 

All songs written by Vincent Cafiso, except where noted:

References

2004 albums
Joy Zipper albums